The Princess Stakes was an American Thoroughbred horse race for three-year-old fillies held in June at Hollywood Park Racetrack in Inglewood, California. The Grade II event was run over a distance of  miles (8.5 furlongs).

Past winners of the Princess Stakes

Earlier winners

 1990 - A Wild Ride
 1989 - Imaginary Lady
 1988 - Clean Lines
 1987 - Ransomed Captive 
 1986 - Melair
 1985 - Fran's Valentine
 1984 - Gene's Lady
 1983 - Sweet Diane
 1982 - Faneuil Lass
 1981 - Balletomane
 1980 - Disconiz
 1979 - Prize Spot
 1978 - B. Thoughtful
 1977 - Taisez Vous
 1976 - Hail Hilarious
 1975 - Call Me Proper
 1974 - Lucky Spell
 1973 - Card Table
 1972 - Le Cle
 1971 - Turkish Trousers
 1970 - Thoroly Blue
 1969 - Tipping Time
 1968 - Miss Ribot
 1967 - Gamely
 1966 - Miss Kat Bird

References

Hollywood Park Media Guide

Discontinued horse races
Horse races in California
Hollywood Park Racetrack
Flat horse races for three-year-old fillies
Graded stakes races in the United States
1966 establishments in California
Recurring sporting events established in 1966
2001 disestablishments in California
Recurring sporting events disestablished in 2001